Eucalyptus alligatrix, commonly known as the silver stringybark, is a tree endemic to southeastern Australia. It has rough, fibrous bark on the trunk and branches, lance-shaped adult leaves, flower buds usually arranged in groups of three, white flowers and cup-shaped, bell-shaped or cone-shaped fruit.

Description
It has thick, fibrous, furrowed bark on the trunk and branches. Juvenile leaves are also dull bluish green with a whitish bloom.

The flowers buds are usually arranged in groups of three, sometimes seven, in leaf axils. The operculum is cone-shaped and slightly shorter than the floral cup.

Taxonomy and naming
Eucalyptus alligatrix was first formally described in 1991 by Lawrie Johnson and Ken Hill from a specimen collected south-west of Jamieson. The description was published in the journal Telopea. The specific epithet (alligatrix) is the feminine form of the Latin word alligator meaning "one who binds", hence "she who binds together", referring to the characteristics of this species that are intermediate between those of E. cinerea and E. cephalocarpa.
 
In 1995, Ian Brooker and Andrew Slee described three subspecies and published the descriptions in Australian Systematic Botany:

Distribution and habitat
This eucalypt grows in woodland, often regenerating in previously cleared paddocks.
 Subspecies alligatrix grows in the Eildon, Jamieson and Big River areas in Victoria;
 Subspecies limaensis is only known from near Swanpool in Victoria;
 Subspecies miscella has a restricted distribution near Rylstone in New South Wales.

Conservation
Subspecies limaensis and miscella are both classified as "Vulnerable" under the Australian Government Environment Protection and Biodiversity Conservation Act 1999. The main threats to Lima stringybark include ringbarking of trees by livestock, soil degradation, weed invasion and grazing. A recovery plan for the subspecies has been prepared. Subspecies miscella is only known from a single grazing property near Rylstone where regeneration is minimal. The main threats to this subspecies include grazing by livestock, habitat destruction and inappropriate fire regimes.

References

alligatrix
Myrtales of Australia
Flora of New South Wales
Flora of Victoria (Australia)
Trees of Australia
Plants described in 1991
Taxa named by Lawrence Alexander Sidney Johnson
Taxa named by Ken Hill (botanist)